Oleksandr Serhiyovych Svatok (born 27 September 1994) is a Ukrainian professional footballer who plays as a centre-back for Dnipro-1.

Career
Svatok is a product of the FC Dnipro youth sportive school and signed a contract with this club in the Ukrainian Premier League in 2011.

He played 4 years for FC Dnipro Dnipropetrovsk Reserves and Youth Team in the Ukrainian Premier League Reserves Championship and in August 2014 went on loan to FC Volyn in the Ukrainian Premier League. Svatok made his debut for FC Volyn playing first time in a match against FC Zorya Luhansk on 31 August 2014 in the Ukrainian Premier League.

On 15 February 2019, Oleksandr joined Croatian club Hajduk Split on a 3,5 year deal.

On 28 December 2019, Oleksandr joined Ukrainian club Dnipro-1.

Honors
Dnipro
 UEFA Europa League (1): runner-up 2014–15

References

External links
 
 

1994 births
Living people
People from Kamianske
Ukrainian footballers
Ukraine youth international footballers
Ukraine under-21 international footballers
Association football defenders
FC Dnipro players
FC Volyn Lutsk players
FC Zorya Luhansk players
HNK Hajduk Split players
SC Dnipro-1 players
Ukrainian Premier League players
Croatian Football League players
Ukrainian expatriate footballers
Expatriate footballers in Croatia
Ukrainian expatriate sportspeople in Croatia
Sportspeople from Dnipropetrovsk Oblast